Seven ships of the British Royal Navy have been named HMS Dido, after Dido, the legendary founder and queen of Carthage.

 was a 28-gun sixth-rate launched in 1784 and sold in 1817.
 was an 18-gun corvette launched in 1836, used as a coal hulk after 1860, and sold in 1903. Designed by Symonds and built at Pembroke. Took part in Syrian war of 1840 and Chinese war of 1842.  In Pacific 1855. Became a coal-hulk at Sheerness and was sold in 1903.
HMS Dido was to have been a wooden screw-propelled corvette. Laid down on 14 January 1861, construction was cancelled on 12 December 1863.
 was a wooden  screw corvette launched in 1869, hulked in 1886, renamed HMS Actaeon in 1906 and sold in 1922.
 was an  second class cruiser launched in 1896, used as a depot ship after 1913 and sold in 1926.
 was a  light cruiser, launched on 18 July 1939 and broken up in 1958.
 was a  launched in 1961. She was sold to the Royal New Zealand Navy in 1983 and was renamed HMNZS Southland. She was decommissioned in 1995 and scrapped at Goa in India.

Battle honours
Ships named Dido have earned the following battle honours:

Minerve 1795
Egypt 1801
Syria 1840
China 1842
Crete 1941
Sirte 1942
Mediterranean 1942–44
Malta Convoys 1942
Sicily 1943
Salerno 1943
Aegean 1943
Anzio 1944
South France 1944
Arctic 1944

See also
  was a 38-gun fifth rate frigate captured from the French in 1805 and broken up in 1811.

Royal Navy ship names